Cyperus pratensis is a species of sedge that is endemic to Ethiopia.

The species was first formally described by the botanist Johann Otto Boeckeler in 1874.

See also 
 List of Cyperus species

References 

pratensis
Taxa named by Johann Otto Boeckeler
Plants described in 1874
Flora of Ethiopia